Profundiconus smirnoides is a species of sea snails, a marine gastropod mollusc in the family Conidae, the cone snails and their allies.

Like all species within the genus Profundiconus, these cone snails are predatory and venomous. They are capable of "stinging" humans, therefore live ones should be handled carefully or not at all.

Description
The size of the shell attains 80 mm.

Distribution
This marine species occurs at the Norfolk Ridge off New Caledonia.

References

 M. Tenorio, Note on Profundiconus smirna with description of a new species : Profundiconus smirnoides n.sp; 	Xenophora Taxonomy N° 7 - Supplément au Xenophora n° 150 - Avril 2015

External links
 

smirnoides
Gastropods described in 2015